Carl Duval Moore State Forest is in the central portion of Putnam County, Florida east of Interlachen, Florida. The northern tract of the state forest is located beside Up and Down Lake and includes a 1.5 mile trail. A second southern tract is located by the northeast bank of Hardesty Lake. In 1993, the property was deeded by the Carl Duval Moore estate to the state of Florida to be used for public purposes as a forest.

See also
List of Florida state forests
Florida State Parks

References

External links
 Carl Duval Moore State Forest - official site

Florida state forests
Protected areas of Putnam County, Florida
Protected areas established in 1993
1993 establishments in Florida